Boris Buša (born 25 April 1997) is a Serbian volleyball player, playing in position opposite.

His older sister, Bianka, is also a volleyball player.

Clubs 
Serbia Super Cup:
  2019, 2020
Serbia Cup:
  2020
Championship of Serbia:
  2020, 2021
Central European League - MEVZA:
  2022
Croatian Cup:
  2022
Championship of Croatia:
  2022

References

External links
 Volleybox profile
 ChampionsLeague.CEV profile
 CEV profile
 OSSRB-Web.Data Project profile

1997 births
Living people
Serbian men's volleyball players
Serbian expatriate sportspeople in Croatia